Official Bootleg CD - Live at the Tim Sims Theatre is a Canadian comedy album, performed by The Frantics comedy troupe. It contains largely new material (the only exceptions are "Einstein Song", and "Dutch Cowboys", which derive from their Frantic Times radio series), used in their "Older But Wider" tour in 2004. The sketches were recorded from a single night's performance on June 24, 2004 at the Tim Sims Playhouse in Toronto.

Personnel
 Paul Chato
 Rick Green
 Dan Redican
 Peter Wildman

Track listing
"American Jesus"
"Timmy Target Hotel"
"Army Careers"
"Do You Wanna"
"Good Shit"
"Naughty Aliens"
"The Offering"
"Einstein Song"
"Photo of Mary"
"Raccoon Startler"
"Dutch Cowboys"

External links
Albums listings on The Frantics official Web site

The Frantics (comedy) albums
Official Bootleg CD
2000s comedy albums